Geary County (county code GE) is a county located in the U.S. state of Kansas. As of the 2020 census, the county population was 36,739. Its county seat and most populous city is Junction City. The county is named in honor of Governor John W. Geary.

History

Early history

For many millennia, the Great Plains of North America was inhabited by nomadic Native Americans.  From the 16th century to 18th century, the Kingdom of France claimed ownership of large parts of North America.  In 1762, after the French and Indian War, France secretly ceded New France to Spain, per the Treaty of Fontainebleau.

19th century
In 1802, Spain returned most of the land to France, but keeping title to about 7,500 square miles.  In 1803, most of the land for modern day Kansas was acquired by the United States from France as part of the 828,000 square mile Louisiana Purchase for 2.83 cents per acre.

In 1854, the Kansas Territory was organized, then in 1861 Kansas became the 34th U.S. state.  Geary County was formed on August 30, 1855, as an original county from open, free territory.  It was among the first 33 counties established by the territory government.

Geary County was originally named Davis County in 1855 after Jefferson Davis (then the United States Secretary of War). During the American Civil War, when Davis became president of the Confederacy, attempts were made to change the county's name, but both failed. Federal and state census records show it as Davis County from 1860 through 1885. In 1888 the county was renamed in honor of John W. Geary, an early Governor of the Kansas Territory.

Geography
It is the second-smallest county in Kansas by land area and third-smallest by total area.

Adjacent counties
 Riley County (north)
 Wabaunsee County (east)
 Morris County (south)
 Dickinson County (west)
 Clay County (northwest)

Demographics

Geary County is part of the Manhattan, KS Metropolitan Statistical Area.

As of the 2000 census, there were 27,947 people, 10,458 households, and 7,582 families residing in the county. There were 11,959 housing units at an average density of 31 per square mile (12/km2). The racial makeup of the county was 64.13% White, 22.03% Black or African American, 0.75% Native American, 3.16% Asian, 0.41% Pacific Islander, 4.10% from other races, and 5.41% from two or more races. Hispanic or Latino of any race were 8.45% of the population.

There were 10,458 households, out of which 39.60% had children under the age of 18 living with them, 56.90% were married couples living together, 12.30% had a female householder with no husband present, and 27.50% were non-families. 22.50% of all households were made up of individuals, and 7.80% had someone living alone who was 65 years of age or older.  The average household size was 2.61 and the average family size was 3.07.

In the county, the population was spread out, with 29.60% under the age of 18, 13.60% from 18 to 24, 30.00% from 25 to 44, 17.40% from 45 to 64, and 9.40% who were 65 years of age or older.  The median age was 29 years. For every 100 females, there were 97.30 males.  For every 100 females age 18 and over, there were 94.30 males.

The median income for a household in the county was $31,917, and the median income for a family was $36,372. Males had a median income of $25,942 versus $21,389 for females. The per capita income for the county was $16,199.  About 9.70% of families and 12.10% of the population were below the poverty line, including 16.80% of those under age 18 and 9.90% of those age 65 or over.

Government

Presidential elections
For most of its history, Geary County has been dominated by the Republican Party. The party's presidential candidates have failed to win the county only seven times from 1880 to the present day, the last of these occurring in 1964.

Laws
Geary County was a prohibition, or "dry", county until the Kansas Constitution was amended in 1986 and voters approved the sale of alcoholic liquor by the individual drink with a 30% food sales requirement.  The food sales requirement was removed with voter approval in 1990.

The county voted "No" on the 2022 Kansas Value Them Both Amendment, an anti-abortion ballot measure, by 61% to 39% despite backing Donald Trump with 55% of the vote to Joe Biden's 41% in the 2020 presidential election.

Education

Unified school districts
 Geary County USD 475

Communities

Cities
 Grandview Plaza
 Junction City (county seat) 
 Milford

Unincorporated community
 Wreford

Ghost towns
 Alida, razed when Milford Lake was built

Fort Riley
The fort has a daytime population of nearly 25,000 and includes one census-designated place:
 Fort Riley (formerly Fort Riley North), primarily in Riley County

Townships
Geary County is divided into eight townships.  The city of Junction City is considered governmentally independent and is excluded from the census figures for the townships.  In the following table, the population center is the largest city (or cities) included in that township's population total, if it is of a significant size.

See also
 National Register of Historic Places listings in Geary County, Kansas

References

Further reading

 Standard Atlas of Geary County, Kansas; Geo. A. Ogle & Co; 42 pages; 1909.

External links

County
 
 Geary County - Directory of Public Officials
Other
 Junction City and Geary County Economic Development
 Geary County Convention and Visitors Bureau
 Fort Riley 
Historical
 Geary County Kansas AHGP
Maps
 Geary County Maps: Current, Historic, KDOT
 Kansas Highway Maps: Current, Historic, KDOT
 Kansas Railroad Maps: Current, 1996, 1915, KDOT and Kansas Historical Society

 
Kansas counties
1889 establishments in Kansas
Manhattan, Kansas metropolitan area
Populated places established in 1889